Alg2 mannosyltransferase may refer to:

 GDP-Man:Man2GlcNAc2-PP-dolichol alpha-1,6-mannosyltransferase, an enzyme
 Glycolipid 3-alpha-mannosyltransferase, an enzyme